Lomatium howellii is an uncommon species of flowering plant in the carrot family known by the common name Howell's biscuitroot, or Howell's lomatium. It is native to the Klamath Mountains of southern Oregon and northern California, where it is a member of the local serpentine soils flora.

Description
Lomatium howellii is a perennial herb growing up to 80 centimeters tall from a thick, branching taproot. It often lacks a stem, producing upright inflorescences and leaves from ground level. The long leaves may exceed a meter long and are each made up of many oval or rounded toothed leaflets. The inflorescence is an umbel of small yellow or purplish flowers.

External links
 Calflora Database: Lomatium howellii (Howell's biscuitroot,  Howell's lomatium)
Jepson Manual eFlora treatment of Lomatium howellii
USDA Plants Profile for Lomatium howellii (Howell's biscuitroot)
UC CalPhoto gallery of Lomatium howellii

howellii
Flora of California
Flora of Oregon
Flora of the Klamath Mountains
Endemic flora of the United States
Natural history of the California Coast Ranges
Taxa named by Willis Linn Jepson
Taxa named by Sereno Watson
Plants described in 1885
Flora without expected TNC conservation status